The untitled Ghostbusters: Afterlife sequel is an upcoming American supernatural comedy film directed by Gil Kenan. It serves as the sequel to Ghostbusters: Afterlife (2021), and as the fifth installment in the Ghostbusters franchise.

The film is scheduled to be released by Sony Pictures Releasing on December 20, 2023.

Cast
 Mckenna Grace as Phoebe Spengler
 Finn Wolfhard as Trevor Spengler
 Carrie Coon as Callie Spengler
 Paul Rudd as Gary Grooberson
 Ernie Hudson as Winston Zeddemore

Production 
Following the release of Ghostbusters: Afterlife in December 2021, Dan Aykroyd has expressed interest in having the surviving cast of the original Ghostbusters team reprise their roles in up to three sequels.

In April 2022, it was announced that a sequel to Ghostbusters: Afterlife (2021) was in early development at Sony Pictures.

In June 2022, the film was confirmed by director Jason Reitman under the working title Firehouse. That same month it was announced that the sequel would take place in New York City. On June 28, 2022, The Hollywood Reporter announced that the film will be released on December 20, 2023. On October 5, 2022, Mckenna Grace announced that she would reprise her role. The following month, Ernie Hudson revealed he read a script for the film.

In December 2022, it was announced that Gil Kenan would take over as director from Reitman, who still remains as a writer and producer. It was also announced that Paul Rudd, Finn Wolfhard, and Carrie Coon would return.

Filming 
Principal photography began on March 20, 2023, under the working title Firehouse, with Eric Steelberg serving as the cinematographer.

Release 
The film is scheduled to be released by Sony Pictures Releasing on December 20, 2023.

References

External links 
 

2020s American films
Upcoming films
2020s English-language films
American sequel films
2020s ghost films
Ghostbusters films
Films shot in London
Columbia Pictures films
Sony Pictures films
Films directed by Gil Kenan
Sequel films